Hendrikus "Henk" Vredeling (20 November 1924 – 27 October 2007) was a Dutch politician of the Labour Party (PvdA).

Decorations

References

External links

Official
  Ir. H. (Henk) Vredeling Parlement & Politiek

 
 

1924 births
2007 deaths
Commanders of the Order of Orange-Nassau
Dutch agronomists
Dutch atheists
Dutch nonprofit directors
Dutch trade union leaders
Dutch resistance members
Dutch European Commissioners
Former Calvinist and Reformed Christians
Knights of the Order of the Netherlands Lion
Ministers of Defence of the Netherlands
Members of the House of Representatives (Netherlands)
MEPs for the Netherlands 1958–1979
Reformed Churches (Liberated) Christians from the Netherlands
Labour Party (Netherlands) MEPs
Labour Party (Netherlands) politicians
Wageningen University and Research alumni
People from Amersfoort
People from Zeist
20th-century Dutch engineers
20th-century Dutch politicians
European Commissioners 1977–1981
20th-century agronomists